Talha is an armoured personnel carrier (APC) designed and manufactured in Pakistan by APC Factory of Heavy Industries Taxila (HIT).

The vehicle is based on the M113-A2-Mk.1 APC. The Pakistan Army plans to deploy 2,000 Talha APCs by year 2010.  TALHA is an all terrain, amphibious infantry support vehicle with 12.7 mm machine gun as its main armament. Adequate crew compartment space provides excellent crew comfort. Survivability is enhanced through use of external fuel tanks.  Various forms of bolt-on armour can be added to increase armour protection of the vehicle.

History
The decision to develop the Talha was made after U.S. sanctions imposed on Pakistan made it impossible for HIT to continue manufacturing the M113. The Talha's design is based on the M113, one notable difference being the positions of the engine and driver station.

The Al-Talha is being marketed for export and was displayed at the IDEAS 2002 defence exhibition, Karachi, in 2002. In November 2004 an Iraqi delegation ordered 44 Talha APCs.

Engine
There is a flexibility in the design that the Engine compartment can accommodate power pack with 275 HP Detroit Diesel 6V53T turbocharged engine or 330 HP UTD-20, a Ukrainian engine

Operators

Current operators

Pakistan Army: 400+ in Service; Total 2,000 planned to be deployed.

Iraqi Army: 44 delivered by Pakistan in 2006.

Civilian operators

Sindh Police: 40 delivered by Wah Ordnance Factory in 2012.

Variants

 Maaz - Fitted with Baktar-Shikan anti-tank missile firing unit
 Mouz - Fitted with RBS 70 surface-to-air missile firing unit 
 Sakb - Command post vehicle
 Al Qaswa - Logistics & cargo vehicle

APC Saad

APC Saad is a stretched 6 road wheel variant of Talha.
Further variants of Saad:
 Al-Hadeed - Armoured recovery vehicle
 Al-Hamza - Infantry fighting vehicle

See also

 Armoured personnel carrier
 Heavy Industries Taxila
 Armoured personnel carrier
Related development
 M113
Related lists
 List of modern armoured fighting vehicles

References

Science and technology in Pakistan
Armoured fighting vehicles of Pakistan
Armoured fighting vehicles of the post–Cold War period
Tracked armoured personnel carriers